Pulao, known in some early sources also as tulao, and Pu Lao, is a Chinese dragon, and one of the 9 sons of the dragon. It is said in Chinese mythology that he likes to "roar", and therefore he is traditionally depicted on top of bells in China, and used as the hook by which the bells are hung.

Pulao appeared in Chinese literature already during the Tang Dynasty. The Tang Dynasty scholar Li Shan (630－689), in his comments on Ban Gu's (32–92 AD) "Eastern Metropolis Rhapsody" (Dong Du Fu), wrote:
In the sea there is a big fish called whale, and on the shore there is a creature whose name is pulao. The pulao has always been afraid of the whale. Whenever the whale strikes [or attacks] him, pulao cries [or roars] loudly. Thus those who want to make a loud [bell] would put a pulao on top. Therefore the  bell-striker would be made [in the shape of] a whale. 

<blockquote>

The tulao'''s form is like that of a dragon, but small. By its nature it likes to roar, and has supernatural strength. [They] used to hang bells [by the tulao].
 
</blockquote>
Later on, the pulao'', with similar descriptions, was integrated into various lists of the Nine Children of the Dragon compiled by later Ming Dynasty authors such as Li Dongyang and Yang Shen.

Notes

References

   (Section 1, Section 2, Section 3).

Chinese dragons
Bells (percussion)